Jeonju Baseball Stadium is a baseball stadium in the city of Jeonju, South Korea. It is former home of the Haitai Tigers and Ssangbangwool Raiders. The stadium holds 10,000 people.

Baseball venues in South Korea